George Haas Jr. (September 10, 1920 – June 12, 2006) was an American businessman and polo player. He founded the Haas Financial Corporation.

Biography

Early life
George Haas Jr. was born on September 10, 1920, in New York City. He attended Brooks School, a private school in North Andover, Massachusetts. He graduated from Yale University, where he won his first polo trophy in 1938.

Second World War
He joined the United States Army in the Second World War and served as a 2nd Lieutenant in the 6th Armored Division. He was captured by German soldiers and managed to escape six months later. He later received the Silver Star, the Purple Heart and the Air Medal.

Business
In the 1950s, he worked in industrial sales for The Coca-Cola Company, followed by PepsiCo. In 1960, he founded the Haas Financial Corporation headquartered in New York City. It specialized in beverage industry mergers and acquisitions as well as commercial aviation leases.

Polo
As a professional polo player, he won the East Coast Open three times, the Monty Waterbury Cup three times and the Arena Sherman Memorial.

He served as President of the Gulfstream Polo Club in Lake Worth, Florida. In 2003, he sold his property near the grounds of the Gulfstream Polo Club, in the midst of controversy about the possible relocation of the club.

As chairman of the United States Polo Association's Safety and International Committees, he improved the safety of polo helmets. He also served on the executive committee of the Federation of International Polo. He served as chairman of the Polo Training Foundation. He served on the board of the Museum of Polo and Hall of Fame and was inducted on February 16, 2002.

Personal life
He died on June 12, 2006.

Bibliography
Against All Odds (1998)

References

1920 births
2006 deaths
Businesspeople from New York City
Yale University alumni
American polo players
People from Lake Worth Beach, Florida
Brooks School alumni
20th-century American businesspeople
United States Army personnel of World War II
United States Army officers
American prisoners of war in World War II
World War II prisoners of war held by Germany
American escapees
Escapees from German detention